Ange Kagame (born September 8, 1993) is the second child and only daughter of Paul Kagame, current president of Rwanda. She has been involved in causes that include women's empowerment, education, and poverty eradication, as well as mass vaccination campaigns. She is married to Bertrand Ndengeyingoma.

Early life and education
Kagame was born September 8, 1993 in Brussels, Belgium. Her father is Paul Kagame, the sixth and current President of the Republic of Rwanda and the leader of Rwanda's majority party the Rwandan Patriotic Front. Her mother Jeannette Nyiramongi is the first lady of the Republic of Rwanda. As the first daughter of the president, she holds both formal and informal power and influence.

Kagame completed her education abroad and was absent from the public eye for most of her childhood due to security and privacy reasons. She attended Dana Hall School, a private preparatory school located in Wellesley, Massachusetts in the United States. She attended Smith College where she majored in political science with a minor in African studies. She also holds a master's degree in international affairs from Columbia University. Kagame can speak three languages, English, Kinyarwanda, and French.

Other activities

In 2014, Kagame accompanied her father to the White House for a dinner hosted by President Barack Obama. The dinner was part of the three-day-long United States–Africa Leaders Summit held in August of that year, at which the leaders of the majority of African countries met to discuss trade, investment and security of the continent.

Personal life
Kagame is the second oldest child with three siblings, Ivan Cyomoro, Ian Kagame, and Brian Kagame. She is a basketball and football fan, and follows the Boston Celtics and Arsenal. On 6 July 2019, at the Intare Conference Centre in Kigali, Ange dated a South African USD multi-millionaire businessman, Zack Nyathi, before she married Bertrand Ndengeyingoma. In 2020, they welcomed their baby daughter Ava Ndengeyingoma.

See also
 History of Rwanda
 Politics of Rwanda

References

Living people
People from Brussels
Tutsi people
Rwandan Roman Catholics
1993 births
Dana Hall School alumni
Smith College alumni
School of International and Public Affairs, Columbia University alumni